Barpak is a village situated in the northern part of the Gorkha district of Nepal, in the Barpak village development committee. It is inhabited by Gurungs, Ghales, Sunars, Pariyars and others.

History

2015 earthquake 

Being close to the epicentre and lodged on a steep hillside, the village was extremely hard hit by the April 2015 Nepal earthquake. Reports say less than 10 of 1,200 homes remain standing.

References 

Gorkha District
Populated places in Gorkha District